Edward Atkinson may refer to:

Edward Atkinson (activist) (1827–1905), inventor of the "Aladdin cooker" and founder of the Anti-Imperialist League
Sir Edward Tindal Atkinson (1878–1957), British barrister and judge
Edward L. Atkinson (1881–1929), Royal naval surgeon and Antarctic explorer
Edward Dawson Atkinson (1891–1934), World War I flying ace
Edward Atkinson (Master of Clare College, Cambridge) (1819–1915)
Edward Dupré Atkinson (1855–1937), Archdeacon of Dromore

See also
Ed Atkinson (1851–?), American professional baseball player
Ted Atkinson (1916–2005), Canadian jockey
Ted Atkinson (footballer) (1920–2016), Australian footballer